Edward Donald Bellew,  (28 October 1882 – 1 February 1961, Kamloops, British Columbia), Captain of the 7th Bn British Columbia Regiment, CEF was a Canadian recipient of the Victoria Cross, the highest and most prestigious award for gallantry in the face of the enemy that can be awarded to British and Commonwealth forces.

Early life
Bellew was born in Bombay, India, on 28 October 1882. He began his education at Blundell's School, Devon, England, but left to attend Clifton College (1897–1900), from where he was admitted to the Royal Military College, Sandhurst. He joined the Royal Irish Regiment in 1901. He emigrated to Canada in 1903 and worked as a construction engineer. In September 1914, shortly after the outbreak of the First World War, he enlisted in the British Columbia Regiment.

Action
Bellew was 32 years old, and a lieutenant in the 7th (1st British Columbia) Battalion, Canadian Expeditionary Force, when the following deed took place for which he was awarded the VC.

During the Second Battle of Ypres, a mass attack on the Canadian line developed on the morning of Saturday 24 April 1915 near Keerselaere, Belgium. The Canadians were suffering heavy casualties. The advance of the enemy was temporarily stayed by Lieutenant Bellew, the battalion machine-gun officer, who had two guns in action on high ground when the enemy's attack broke in full force. The sergeant was killed and Bellew wounded. Nevertheless, he maintained his fire until his ammunition failed, when he seized a rifle, smashed his machine-gun and, fighting to the last, was taken prisoner.

Later life
Bellew remained a prisoner of war (latterly in Holzminden prisoner-of-war camp) until 1919, and achieved the rank of Captain. He subsequently returned to Canada and became a dredging inspector. He died in 1961 and is buried at Hillside Cemetery, Kamloops, British Columbia.

Family
Bellew was the second cousin of Robert Bellew Adams, VC.

Loss of medal
Bellew's Victoria Cross is believed to have been stolen from the Royal Canadian Military Institute, Toronto, between January 1975 and 22 July 1977. It has never been recovered.

References

External links
 Edward Donald Bellew's digitized service file
Legion Magazine article on Edward Donald Bellew
 
 List of Canadian Victoria Cross recipients

Further reading 
Monuments to Courage (David Harvey, 1999)
The Register of the Victoria Cross (This England, 1997)
VCs of the First World War - The Western Front 1915 (Peter F. Batchelor & Christopher Matson, 1999)
"On the Battlefields", From the archives of "Maclean's Magazine", Edited by Michael Benedict, Penguin Canada, 2002 , page 96

Canadian World War I recipients of the Victoria Cross
1882 births
1961 deaths
People educated at Clifton College
People educated at Blundell's School
Military personnel from Mumbai
Graduates of the Royal Military College, Sandhurst
Royal Irish Regiment (1684–1922) officers
British emigrants to Canada
Canadian prisoners of war in World War I
World War I prisoners of war held by Germany
Canadian Expeditionary Force officers
Canadian military personnel of World War I
Military personnel of British India
British people in colonial India